is a Japanese singer-songwriter and actor. He is the frontman of the punk rock band , formed in 2003 after the breakup his previous band GOING STEADY.

Biography

Born in Yamanobe, Higashimurayama District, Yamagata, Mineta's parents owned and operated the electronics dealership . Mineta formed the punk rock band GOING STEADY in 1996, which included his high school classmate  on drums. The band was signed to Libra Records—part of the larger independent label UK Project—from the release of their first single "You & I" in 1999 until they formed their own label  (also a sublabel of UK Project), which released GOING STEADY's fifth single   and all material from GOING STEADY, Ging Nang Boyz and their related projects thereafter. At the peak of their popularity, the band broke up on 15 January 2003, shortly before they were to begin a national tour.

That year, an Elephant Kashimashi tribute album titled  was released, and it featured a solo a cappella recording by Mineta under the moniker . After that, Ginnan Boyz became his band regime, and Mineta is in charge of vocals and guitar. On 15 January 2005, the band released two albums simultaneously Kimi to Boku no Dai Sanji Sekai Taisen-teki Renai Kakumei and Door.

During his solo career, he starred in the film Iden & Tity as the leading character Nakajima. In 2002 and 2005, he released two books Mayonaka no Futari-goto and Futari-goto co-authored with the Onanie Machine bassist and vocalist Inomar. The DVD version of Futari-goto was also released, and he carries out a wide range of activities as well as music.

In 2005, he got naked during a live performance in the Rock in Japan Festival 2005, and sent out documents.

In 2006, Mineta and guitarist Chin Nakamura, as well as four non-celebrity women recruited from their own blog debut as Binkan Dhōnen-tai. He released the book "Koi to Taikutsu" with his modified blog.

Ginnan Boyz's documentary DVD Bokutachi wa Sekai o Kaeru koto ga dekinai. was released on 11 April 2007. He later appeared in the role of a pornographic actor in the film version of Gummy-Chocolate-Pine created by Kenji Ohtsuki.

On the night of 28 July 2007, when he appeared in a concert in Taipei, Taiwan, he took off his underwear on  stage and showed his lower body and prompting an interrogation by police authorities. According to the Taiwanese newspaper United Daily News the following day, during the demonstration he pulled his pants down to the knees, singing closer to the audience at the stage. The organizer later said that the pants accidentally fell down when crouching, but the police authorities said that they would be offending criminal disturbances of criminal law. When Mineta dropped his underwear, a part of the audience got excited and rushed to the stage (that the venue showed a considerable excitement with the call to Ginnan Boyz even after their live concert ended). Afterwards, the document was sent to the public on charges of obscene neglect, paid a fine of 9,000 Taiwanese dollars and returned to Japan on the following day (he informed the local people who wanted the story of the article, not the audience nor stakeholder journalists). Since he never returned to Taiwan to face further prosecution, he was given a judgment of "Exempt from Prosecution" by Taipei District Court on 31 July 2020.

He appeared in Monster Bash, an outdoor festival held in Kagawa Prefecture on 25 August 2007. Minneta became naked just before leaving the stage, and band member Shinya Abiko lowered his head and apologized.

On 24 December 2008, a male fan's genitalia was chewed by another male fan and cried at a collaborative project with Inomar of Onanie Machine who appeared at Ginnan Boyz's Dōtei-tachi no Christmas Eve 2008.

On 20 April 2009, at a preliminary show preview of the film Shikisoku Generation (directed by Tomorowo Taguchi), an interview conducted for a reporter to the performer Asami Usuda with frequent sexual harassment questions such as "free sex faction?" Mineta, who fogged his expression on this, had a curtain to interrogate about twenty minutes and said "how did you hear it?" to the reporter after the interview.

His first starring role in a serial drama was in the Premium Drama Kiseki no Hito of NHK BS Premium in 2016.

Filmography

Films

Television

Music videos

References

External links
 
Kazunobu Mineta no Asayake Nyannyan 
Kazunobu Mineta no Gabugabu Die Ally 

GINGNANGBOYZofficial - YouTube
Apple Music
Amazon Music Unlimited
Spotify

Japanese male singer-songwriters
Japanese singer-songwriters
Actors from Yamagata Prefecture
Musicians from Yamagata Prefecture
Japanese male rock singers
Japanese male actors
1977 births
Living people
21st-century Japanese singers
21st-century Japanese male singers